Mylothris rhodope, the common dotted border, Rhodope or tropical dotted border, is a butterfly in the family Pieridae. It is found in Sierra Leone, Liberia, Ivory Coast, Ghana, Togo, Nigeria, Cameroon, Equatorial Guinea, Bioko, the Republic of the Congo, the Central African Republic, Angola, the Democratic Republic of the Congo, Burundi, Rwanda, western Uganda, north-western Tanzania and north-western Zambia. The habitat consists of lowland forests.

Adult males have been recorded mud-puddling on the banks of forest streams. Females fly low and stay amongst shady places in the forest.

The larvae feed on Santalales species.

References

Seitz, A. Die Gross-Schmetterlinge der Erde 13: Die Afrikanischen Tagfalter. Plate XIII 11

Butterflies described in 1775
Pierini
Taxa named by Johan Christian Fabricius